The Trinitarian formula is the phrase "in the name of the Father, and of the Son, and of the Holy Spirit", or words to that form and effect, referring to the three persons of the Christian Trinity. It is often followed by an "amen".

The Trinitarian formula is used in baptism as well as in numerous prayers, rites, liturgies, and sacraments. One of its most common uses apart from baptism is when Roman Catholics, Eastern and Oriental Orthodox, Lutherans, Anglicans, Methodists, and others make the sign of the cross while reciting the formula.

Biblical origin
These words are quoted from a command of the risen Jesus in the Great Commission: "Go, therefore, and make disciples of all nations, baptizing them in
 the name of the Father, and of the Son, and of the Holy Spirit" (Matthew 28:19).

The passage does appear to be quoted in the Didache (7:1-3), and it is mostly accepted as authentic due to its supporting manuscript evidence.
Nevertheless, some scholars have held the view that the passage is an interpolation on account of its absence from the first few centuries of early Christian quotations, in which case it would be part of an apostolic or early Christian oral tradition from which both the received texts of Matthew and the Didache emerged.
The view of the passage as an interpolation was in recent times defended by the Jesus Seminar, a nontrinitarian movement active in the 1990s. Critics of the Jesus Seminar described this particular line of argument as eisegesis based on a preconceived conclusion.

Use in baptism
According to the doctrines of Roman Catholicism, Oriental Orthodoxy, Eastern Orthodoxy, and most forms of Protestantism, such as Lutheranism and Anglicanism, a baptism is not valid unless the Trinitarian formula is used in the administration of that sacrament. Consequently, they may not recognize religious communities that baptize without this formula – e.g., Unitarians, Branhamists, Frankists, Jehovah's Witnesses, and Oneness Pentecostals, all of whom deny the Trinity – as Christian religions. This is also the case with baptisms within the Church of Jesus Christ of Latter-day Saints (LDS church). Although LDS members baptize with the same Trinitarian formula, they reject the Nicene Trinitarian conception and regard the three persons of the Trinity as being distinct personages united not in substance, but in dominion and purpose.

Converts to Trinitarian denominations from Mormonism and other nontrinitarian denominations have to be baptized in the name of the (Nicene) Trinity. Other faiths (Frankists, Oneness Pentecostals, and Branhamists in particular) use the formula "In the name of Jesus Christ" (based on Acts 2:38) for baptism, and in turn re-baptize converts who were first baptized under the Trinitarian formula, sometimes claiming that such persons would not have been previously aware that "Jesus is the Lord".

Baptism according to the Trinitiarian formula is seen as being a basis for Christian ecumenism, the concept of working towards the eventual unity of Christians belonging to different Christian denominations.

See also

Sign of the cross
Validity and liceity (Catholic Church)

References

Baptism
Biblical phrases
Christian terminology
Trinitarianism
Religious formulas